Paula is a common female given name (from Latin Pauline, petite). It is used in German, English, Estonian, Finnish, Spanish, Portuguese, Catalan, Romanian, Hungarian, Polish, Dutch, Swedish, Norwegian, Danish, Latvian, Lithuanian and Croatian languages.In Greek it means: Polina. 
Notable people with this name include:

Saint Paula (347–404), saint and follower of St Jerome
Paula Abdul (born 1962), American pop singer and television personality
Paula Acker (1913–1989), German correspondent, journalist, communist activist
Paula Angel (c. 1842–1861), Mexican-American woman executed for the murder of her lover
Paula Badosa, Spanish tennis player
Paula Barker, British Labour politician
Paula Berry (born 1969), American javelin thrower
Paula Byrne (born 1967), English author
Paula Cole (born 1968), American singer-songwriter
Paula Creamer (born 1986), American golfer 
Paula Nicho Cumez (born 1955), Mayan-Guatemalan artist
Paula Davis (born 1973), American state legislator
Paula DeAnda (born 1989), American R&B singer
Paula Deen (born 1947), American cook, restaurateur, writer, and TV personality
Paula Dei Mansi (d. 1288), Italian scribe
Paula Echevarría (born 1977), Spanish model and actress
Paula Fernandes (born 1984), Brazilian singer
Paula Forteza (born 1986), French politician
Paula Fudge (born 1952), English long-distance runner
Paula Green (poet) (born 1955), New Zealand poet and children's author
Paula Gunn Allen (1939–2008), Native American author and activist
Paula Hawkins (politician) (1927–2009), American politician
Paula Hertwig (1889–1983), German biologist, politician
Paula Hitler (1896–1960), Adolf Hitler's sister
Paula Kelley (born 1970), American indie singer-songwriter
Paula Kelly (actress) (1943–2020), American actress and dancer
Paula Kelly (singer) (1919–1992), American big band singer
Paula Lane (born 1986), English actress
Paula Murray (born 1958), Canadian ceramic artist
Paula Nenette Pepin (1908–1990), French composer, pianist and lyricist
Paula Nickolds (born 1973), British businesswoman
Paula Patton (born 1975), American actress
Paula Posavec (born 1996), Croatian handball player
Paula Poundstone (born 1959), American comedian
Paula Radcliffe (born 1973), English long distance runner and Olympian
Paula Rego (1935–2022), Portuguese-British painter and visual artist
Paula Roberson, American biostatistician
Paula Scher (born 1948), American artist
Paula Seling (born 1978), Romanian singer
Paula Jean Swearengin (born 1974), American politician
Paula Taylor (born 1983), Thai actress and model 
Paula Thebert (born 1968), known as Lacey Wildd, American model
Paula Tilbrook (1930–2019), English actress
Paula Todoran (born 1985), Romanian long-distance runner
Paula Tsui (born 1956), Hong Kong singer
Paula Weishoff (born 1962), American volleyball player
Paula White (born 1966), American pastor and televangelist 
Paula Wilcox (born 1949), English actress
Paula Vicente (1519–1576), Portuguese artist, musician and writer
Paula Yates (1959–2000), English television presenter
Paula Zahn (born 1956), American newscaster

In fiction
Doctor Paula Hutchison, a character from the animated series Rocko's Modern Life
Paula Jones, a lead character in the Super Nintendo videogame, EarthBound
Paula Thackery, a recurring character played by Julianne McNamara in the American sitcom television series Charles in Charge

See also 
 Paul (name)
 Paula (disambiguation)
 Paulina (name)
 Pauline (given name)

References

English feminine given names
Estonian feminine given names
German feminine given names
Finnish feminine given names
Spanish feminine given names
Portuguese feminine given names
Romanian feminine given names
Hungarian feminine given names
Polish feminine given names
Dutch feminine given names
Swedish feminine given names
Norwegian feminine given names
Danish feminine given names
Croatian feminine given names
Latin feminine given names